Hüsülü (also, Gusyulyu and Gyusyulyu) is a village and municipality in the Aghjabadi Rayon of Azerbaijan.  It has a population of 4,235.

References 

Populated places in Aghjabadi District